Novosibirsk State University is a public research university located in Novosibirsk, Russia. The university was founded in 1958, on the principles of integration of education and science, early involvement of students with research activities and the engagement of leading scientists in its teaching programmes.

As of 2022, Novosibirsk State University had 246th place in the rating of the QS World University Rankings, and was ranked #503 in the world by U.S. News & World Report, and #801 in the world by World University Rankings by Times Higher Education.

History 
From the perspective of natural resources, Siberia has always been, and remains, the essential region for all of Russia.  In the late 1950s, Siberia provided the country with 75% of its coal and possessed 80% of the nation's hydroelectric resources.  Siberia became industrialized, but science then was largely of the applied variety and did not satisfy its needs. The USSR Academy of Sciences came to understand that there was a need to develop fundamental science. In 1958, this concept was implemented with the establishment of the Siberian Branch of the Academy of Sciences of the Soviet Union at Akademgorodok, near the industrial city of Novosibirsk. From the beginning, the founders of the Siberian Branch of the Academy of Sciences of the Soviet Union were concerned about providing the future scientific center with highly-trained personnel. In order to create a consistent source of personnel replenishment for Siberian scientific institutions, it was necessary to provide advanced training on the spot, thus the idea was born to establish a university in Novosibirsk.

On 9 January 1958, the Novosibirsk State University was officially founded by the Council of Ministers of the Soviet Union decree. First entry examinations were conducted in August 1959. Classes began on 28 September 1959. Following its establishment in 1958, Novosibirsk State University quickly grew.  During the first nine years 1966 professionals were trained within its walls. It consisted of six faculties, was staffed with 270 teachers, and conducted research in 46 sections.

Novosibirsk State University was from its inception existing in close collaborative association with Siberian Branch of the Academy of Sciences research and development institutions of which there are several dozen within an area of 1.5 square km. The project of an "akademgorodok," an academic town with a University as its core, was exhibited at the 1967 World Expo in Montreal, after which Novosibirsk's Akademgorodok became model for other academic towns throughout the Soviet Union.

Political positions; invasion of Ukraine 
On 17 April 2022, members of the community of Novosibirsk State University issued a joint statement strongly condemning the 2022 Russian invasion of Ukraine, calling on the Russian state to immediately withdraw the Russian troops from Ukraine, and bring to justice those responsible for the war crimes during the invasion, and saying “There are no reasonable grounds for this war, thousands of Ukrainian and Russian military and civilians of Ukraine have already died in it, and every day of hostilities brings more and more victims.”

Structure 
Novosibirsk State University has the following educational divisions:
 Institute for the Humanities
 Vladimir Zelman Institute for Medicine and Psychology
 Institute for the Philosophy and Law
 Faculty of Mathematics and Mechanics
 Faculty of Physics
 Faculty of Geology and Geophysics
 Faculty of Natural Sciences
 Faculty of Information Technologies
 Faculty of Economics
 Institute for Retraining and Advanced Training
 Centre of additional education

The structure of the University also includes 9 dissertation councils.

Educational programmes 
As of 2020, Novosibirsk State University conducted training on 43 four-year bachelor's programmes, 7 five-year specialist's programmes, 1 six-year specialist's programmes, 93 two-year master's programmes, 9 two-year residency's programmes, 25 three-year graduate school programmes, 32 four-year graduate school programmes taught in Russian, and 5 two-year master's programmes, 1 two-year residency's programme taught in English.

Additional military education 
As of 2022, Novosibirsk State University doesn't have a military training center. Earlier, the University had military department which conducted the training reserve commissioned officers from among students of the University, but this department was disbanded in 2008.

Language centres 
The University has language centres which offer courses in English, German, French, Italian, Spanish, Japanese, Chinese as a second language.

Education for foreign students

Grants and scholarships 
Every year, international students have an opportunity to apply for the Russian Government Scholarship which covers full tuition and provides a monthly living allowance.  Travel costs, living expenses and a health insurance policy are not included.  These Scholarships are granted on a competitive basis; the selection criteria and procedures as well as the number of scholarships available depend on the home country of applicant. Additionally, students from NSU's partner universities have the opportunity to apply to such programs as Erasmus+, DAAD, and the Fulbright Program.

Distributed education 
In September 2015, NSU announced its first courses delivered on the Coursera platform. Since January 2016, 12 courses have been offered on Coursera, and on the Russian distributed learning platform, Lectorium.

Research internships 
The main feature such research internships are their interdisciplinary approach.  Specialists in biology, physics, mathematics, geology, archaeology, and chemistry work with one another in the 35 research institutes of the Siberian Branch of the Russian Academy of Sciences.

Siberian Summer School 
Beginning in 2017, the Siberian Summer School held at NSU each July includes courses on the Chemistry of Future Materials, Big Data Analytics and the philosophical and historical aspects of East-West relationships.  All Summer School courses are taught in English.

Russian Language Courses 
Novosibirsk State University offers courses for students matriculating with various levels of Russian language competence.

Education for disabled persons 
Novosibirsk State University is one of Russian universities which has established an educational programmes for disabled students.

Research 
Novosibirsk State University is a scientific and educational centre.  Situated in the research center of Siberian Branch of the Russian Academy of Sciences,  Novosibirsk State University's principal areas of teaching and research include elementary particle physics, photonics and quantum optics, Arctic research, biomedicine and cancer therapy, chemical engineering, low-dimensional hybrid materials, omic technologies, mathematics, archaeology and ethnography, and linguistics among other disciplines.

Interdisciplinary Centre for Elementary Particle Physics and Astrophysics 

The Novosibirsk State University Interdisciplinary Centre for Elementary Particle Physics and Astrophysics (ICEPPA) links 13 laboratories working in the fields of elementary particle physics and astrophysics. The Interdisciplinary Centre’s Laboratories participate in large international collaborative scientific projects including experiments in the fields of high energy physics, astrophysics and cosmic ray physics. The Centre is engaged in the following research projects:
 Astrophysics Cosmology and Cosmic Rays
 Experiments on electron-positron colliders
 Experiments on hadron colliders 
 Search for new physical phenomena in experiments with intense muon beams.  The Laboratory for Exploration for Interactions Outside the Standard Model Framework participates in the preparation of two experiments at Fermilab (USA). One experiment, Mu2e, is the search for the conversion of a muon into an electron when interacting with nuclei, while the other experiment, g-2, is devoted to a precise measurement of the magnetic moment of the muon. 
 Development of new detectors and colliders.

The Aston-Novosibirsk State University International Centre for Photonics 

The main objective of the Centre is to develop a physical platform aimed at the application of advanced knowledge in laser technologies, in long-distance communication and in medical sensing devices technologies. The Centre's principal areas of research include:
 advanced concepts and fundamental new theories in nonlinear photonic devices and systems
 new technologies for optical communications, lasers, safe data transmission and medicine
 practical applications of developed technologies in high-speed coherent optical communications, in advanced laser systems for scientific, industrial and medical applications, and in innovative systems for safe data transmission.
The Center for Photonics was created in partnership with Aston University (UK) and offers NSU students access to world-class laboratories in the field of high-speed optical communications, fiber-optic and, femtosecond laser technologies.

International collaborations 
Research groups are involved in 38 international collaborations;

Novosibirsk State University has six international collaborations in the field of physics, elementary particles and astrophysics and 12 ongoing collaborations with the Budker Institute of Nuclear Physics of the Siberian Branch of the Russian Academy of Sciences.

Novosibirsk State University has partnership agreements with 141 universities representing 27 countries.

University journals 
Novosibirsk State University publishes the following journals:
 Vestnik NSU. Series: information technologies in education (ISSN 1818-7900)
 Vestnik NSU. Series: biology, clinical medicine (ISSN 1818-7943)
 Vestnik NSU. Series: mathematics, mechanics, computer science (ISSN 1818-7897)
 Vestnik NSU. Series: history, philology (ISSN 1818-7919)
 Vestnik NSU. Series: pedagogy (ISSN 1818-7889)
 Vestnik NSU. Series: law (ISSN 1818-7986)
 Vestnik NSU. Series: physics (ISSN 1818-7994)
 Vestnik NSU. Series: philosophy (ISSN 1818-796X)
 Vestnik NSU. Series: psychology (ISSN 1995-865X)
 Vestnik NSU. Series: information technologies (online) (ISSN 2410-0420)

Subordinate educational institutions

Specialized Educational Scientific Centre 
The Specialized Educational Scientific Centre (also known as Physics and Mathematics School) is a special secondary school, founded in 1963. It focuses on two fields, including mathematics & physics and chemistry & biology. An education system resembles the college education, with separate general lectures and small-group seminars.

Higher College of Computer Science 
The Higher College of Computer Science is a vocational school focused on the training of programmers.

Chinese-Russian Institute 
The Chinese-Russian Institute conducts educational bachelor's, master's, graduate school programmes in collaboration with Heilongjiang University.

Notable alumni 
 Sergey Alekseenko (born 1950) - Russian/Soviet applied physicist, director of Kutateladze Institute of Thermophysics
 Raissa Berg - geneticist and evolutionary biologist
 Andrey Bocharov (born 1960) - actor and screenwriter
 Konstantin Bryliakov (born 1977) - chemist
 Nikolay Dikansky (born 1941) - physicist
 Viktor Fadin (born 1942) - theoretical physicist
 Alexey Fridman (1940-2010) - astrophysicist
 Nikolay Goncharov (born 1984) - scientist, specialised in plants' genetics
 Sergey Goncharov (born 1951) - mathematician
 Victor Ivrii (born 1949) - Russian-Canadian mathematician, specializes in microlocal analysis, spectral theory and partial differential equations
 Victor Kharitonin (born 1972) - billionaire, co-founder of Pharmstandard
 Bakhadyr Khoussainov (born 1961) - mathematician, Humboldt Prize winner
 Igor Kim (Игорь Ким) (born 1966) - businessman
 Mikhail Kokorich (born 1976) - co-founder of Dauria Aerospace
 Larisa Maksimova (born 1943) - Soviet/Russian mathematician
 Aleksandr Pushnoy (Александр Пушной) (born 1975) - actor, songwriter and TV host 
 Renad Sagdeev (born 1941) - chemist
 Vladimir Shiltsev (born 1965) - Russian-American accelerator physicist
Mark Stockman (born Mark Ilyich Shtokman) - Soviet-born American physicist
 Arkady Vainshtein (born 1942) - Russian-American physicist, winner of 2016 Dirac Medal 
 Valentin Vlasov (1946-2020) - diplomat and politician
 Ershov Yury (born 1940) - mathematician 
 Vladimir E. Zakharov (born 1939) - Russian-American physicist, winner of 2003 Dirac Medal 
 Efim Zelmanov (born 1955) - Russian-American mathematician, winner of 1994 Fields Medal

References

External links
  Novosibirsk State University Homepage
  Novosibirsk State University Homepage
  Novosibirsk State University Homepage

 
Universities and institutes established in the Soviet Union
Educational institutions established in 1959
Sovetsky District, Novosibirsk
1959 establishments in the Soviet Union
National research universities in Russia
Universities in Novosibirsk Oblast
Education in Novosibirsk
Buildings and structures in Novosibirsk